Hanakawa Dam  is a gravity dam located in Miyagi Prefecture in Japan. The dam is used for irrigation. The construction of the dam was completed in 1964.

See also
List of dams in Japan

References

Dams in Miyagi Prefecture